Oxford Rugby League was a semi-professional rugby league club based in Oxford, England. The club was formed in 2012 and joined League 1 in 2013, playing for five seasons before agreeing to merge with Gloucestershire All Golds following the 2017 season, resulting in both clubs exiting the league in order to form  a new club, Bristol Rugby League, which intended to enter League 1 from the 2019 season. However, when this didn't happen, All Golds continued on its own in the southern league, leaving Oxford to simply fold.

History

1976–1993: Early clubs
Oxford University has had a rugby league side since 1976 and has been competing in the annual Rugby League Varsity Match against Cambridge since 1981.

Grassroots rugby league began with the Oxford Sharks, formed in association with the Oxford University team. The Sharks dissolved in 1993, but the amateur Oxford Cavaliers were formed three years later.

2012–2017: League 1
Oxford Rugby League was founded in 2012 and was admitted to the semi-professional League 1 in March 2013 along with Hemel Stags and Gloucestershire All Golds as part of the league's expansion, finishing their first season in 6th position and thus qualifying for the play-offs however they were eliminated in their first match against Hemel Stags.

Following a relatively successful first season, the club struggled to make progress on and off the field. In 2016 the club relocated from their initial base at Iffley Road to Tilsley Park in Abingdon. Following the culmination of the 2017 season, it was announced that Oxford would merge with Gloucestershire All Golds, with both clubs exiting the league in order to pool their resources and create a new club based in Bristol. This ultimately didn't happen, and Oxford RL folded.

Seasons summary

References

 
Organisations based in Oxford
2011 establishments in England
Rugby clubs established in 2012
Rugby league clubs disestablished in 2017
Defunct rugby league teams in England
English rugby league teams